The Hayseeds' Back-blocks Show is a 1917 Australian rural comedy from director Beaumont Smith. It was the third in his series about the rural family, the Hayseeds.

It is considered a lost film.

Synopsis
Dad Hayseed and his friends from Stoney Creek, including Dad Duggan, Cousin Harold, Sam, Tom, Poppy, Molly, Peter, Hopkins and M'Arthur, decide to hold an agricultural show. They go to Brisbane to ask the Governor of Queensland to open it and he agrees. They form a brass band to play, and the show is a great success.

Cast
Fred MacDonald as Jim Hayseed
Tal Ordell as Dad Hayseed
Harry McDonna as Cousin Harold
Agnes Dobson
Collet Dobson

Production
Like the first two Hayseed movies, Beaumont Smith used local appeal to make them attractive to audiences. This one was shot around Brisbane. It was followed by The Hayseeds' Melbourne Cup.

References

External links
The Hayseeds' Back-blocks Show in the Internet Movie Database
The Hayseeds' Back-blocks Show at National Film and Sound Archive

1917 films
Films directed by Beaumont Smith
Lost Australian films
Australian silent feature films
Australian black-and-white films
Australian comedy films
1917 comedy films
1917 lost films
Lost comedy films
Silent comedy films